Seyyed Masoud Hosseini Khamenei (Persian: سید مسعود حسینی خامنه‌ای), also known as "Seyyed Mohsen Khamenei" (Persian: سید محسن خامنه‌ای), is an Iranian Twelver Shia cleric who is the third son of Iran’s supreme leader, Ali Khamenei; and is the brother of Mostafa, Mojtaba and Meitham. Khamenei also has the title of “Hujjatul-Islam”, and is the husband of Sadiq-Kharazi’s sister; likewise, he is the son-in-law of Seyyed Mohsen Kharazi (Tehran’s representative in the assembly of experts). Seyyed Masoud is studying and teaching in the seminary of Qom; and is a member in Society of Seminary Teachers of Qom (Persian: جامعه مدرسین حوزه علمیه قم).

Seyyed Masoud doesn’t have governmental/non-governmental or formal position; moreover, his father (Seyyed Ali Khamenei) has prohibited his son(s) from accepting governmental, or similar positions. According to Mehr News Agency: Seyyed Masoud has the most attention --between Iran’s supreme leader’s sons-- in collecting the memoirs of his father and likewise in running the office of the preservation and publication of Iran's supreme leader works.

Ancestors 

The family (ancestors) of Seyyed Masoud Khamenei are among the Iranian Sayyid families who are from Hosseini Sayyid, and their lineage is connected to the fourth Imam of Shia Islam, Ali ibn Husayn Zayn al-Abidin (Persian/Arabic: علی بن حسین، زین العابدین) (known as "Imam Sajjad") -- according to "Khamenei family tree".

References 

Living people
Year of birth missing (living people)
Children of national leaders
Ali Khamenei
Iranian Shia clerics
Iranian Azerbaijanis